Tisia is a monotypic genus of shield bugs in the tribe Sciocorini, erected by Hoberlandt in 1993. It contains the species Tisia esfandiarii.

References

Sciocorini
Pentatomidae genera